Eurhythma is a genus of moths of the family Crambidae.

Species
Eurhythma argyphea (Turner, 1913)
Eurhythma callipepla (Turner, 1915)
Eurhythma cataxia (Turner, 1913)
Eurhythma epargyra (Turner, 1913)
Eurhythma latifasciella Turner, 1904
Eurhythma polyzelota (Turner, 1913)
Eurhythma xuthospila (Turner, 1913)

References

Crambinae
Crambidae genera
Taxa named by Alfred Jefferis Turner